Ahed's Knee is a 2021 internationally co-produced drama film directed by Nadav Lapid. It was selected to compete for the Palme d'Or at the 2021 Cannes Film Festival. At Cannes, the film shared the Jury Prize with Memoria by Apichatpong Weerasethakul.

Cast
 Avshalom Pollak as Y
 Nur Fibak as Yahalom
 Yoram Honig as the farmer
 Yonathan Kugler as the young Y
 Lidor Ederi as Narkis
 Amit Shoshani as the fearful soldier
 Yehonathan Vilozni as the sergeant
 Naama Preis as the casting director
 Ortal Solomon as Ahed 1
 Mili Eshet as Ahed 2
 Oded Menaster as Smotrich
 Netta Roth as the young actor

Release
The film was selected to compete for the Palme d'Or at the 2021 Cannes Film Festival, it had its premiere on 7 July 2021 in the festival. It was also selected in 'Icon' section of 26th Busan International Film Festival and was screened in the festival in October 2021. It was invited in the Soul of Asia section at the 52nd International Film Festival of India for screening in November.

Reception
On the review aggregator website Rotten Tomatoes, 75% of 59 critics' reviews are positive, with an average rating of 6.7/10. The website's critical consensus reads, "An occasionally uneasy blend of human drama and message movie, Ahed's Knee forcefully reaffirms that the personal is political." Metacritic, which uses a weighted average, assigned the film a score of 80 out of 100 based on 17 critics, indicating "generally favorable reviews".

References

External links
 

2021 films
2021 drama films
Israeli drama films
French drama films
German drama films
2020s Hebrew-language films
Films directed by Nadav Lapid
2020s French films